Essence Uhura Atkins (born February 7, 1972) is an American actress. She began her career appearing on television sitcoms, before her regular role on the short-lived first African-American prime-time drama Under One Roof (CBS, 1995).

Atkins is best known for her roles on television comedies. From 1997 to 1999, she starred as Tasha Yvette Henderson in The WB sitcom Smart Guy. She later went to star as Dee Dee Thorne in UPN sitcom Half & Half (2002–06), Suzanne Kingston-Persons in TBS comedy series Are We There Yet? (2010–13) and as Ashley Wayne in NBC sitcom Marlon (2016-18). In film, Atkins has appeared in Deliver Us from Eva (2003), Dance Flick (2009), A Haunted House (2013), A Haunted House 2 (2014), and The Noel Diary (2022).

Career
Atkins began her career as a teenager guest starring on NBC sitcom The Cosby Show in 1986. The following years she spent playing guest roles on sitcoms include Family Matters, before landing co-leading role opposite James Earl Jones and Vanessa Bell Calloway in the short-lived first African-American prime-time soap opera Under One Roof in 1995. The following year, she co-starred with Keri Russell in the short-lived NBC teen soap opera Malibu Shores. One of her television roles was in the Saved by the Bell spin-off, Saved by the Bell: The College Years in 1993. She appeared in the pilot, but when Tiffani-Amber Thiessen, a regular from the original, opted to return, Atkins's character was written out.

From 1997 to 1999, Atkins starred in the WB sitcom Smart Guy as the older sister Tasha Yvette Henderson. From 2002 to 2006 she starred alongside Rachel True in the UPN sitcom Half & Half playing Dee Dee Thorne, her half-sister. She also had supporting roles in films How High (2001), Deliver Us from Eva (2003) opposite Gabrielle Union, and Dance Flick (2009). From 2010 to 2013, she starred in the TBS sitcom series Are We There Yet? opposite Terry Crews. Atkins later starred alongside Marlon Wayans in the parody films A Haunted House (2013) and A Haunted House 2 (2014). In 2016, she was cast opposite Wayans in his NBC sitcom Marlon. it was canceled after two seasons in 2018.

In 2019, Atkins was cast in a leading role in the Oprah Winfrey Network drama series Ambitions opposite Robin Givens.

Personal life
In September 2009, Atkins married 
All-American collegiate football free safety Jaime Mendez. They met Valentine's Day 2008 through the online dating service Match.com. Her Half and Half co-star Valarie Pettiford performed during the reception.

On August 9, 2011, the couple announced via Twitter that they were expecting their first child together. Essence gave birth to their son in December 2011. The couple divorced in 2016.

Filmography

Film

Television

Awards and nominations

References

External links
 
 

1972 births
Actresses from New York City
Living people
20th-century American actresses
21st-century American actresses
African-American actresses
American television actresses
American film actresses
American child actresses
People from Brooklyn
African-American child actresses
20th-century African-American women
20th-century African-American people
21st-century African-American women
21st-century African-American people